Jon Savage (born Jonathan Malcolm Sage; 2 September 1953 in Paddington, London) is an English writer, broadcaster and music journalist, best known for his history of the Sex Pistols and punk music, England's Dreaming, published in 1991.

Career
Savage read Classics at Magdalene College, Cambridge, graduating in 1975. Becoming a music journalist at the dawn of British punk, he wrote articles on all of the major punk acts, publishing a fanzine called London's Outrage in 1976. A year later he began working as a journalist for Sounds, which was, at that time, one of the UK's three major music papers, along with the New Musical Express and Melody Maker.  Savage interviewed punk, new wave and electronic music artists for Sounds. At that time, he also wrote for the West Coast fanzines Search & Destroy, Bomp! and Slash.

In 1979 he moved to Melody Maker, and a year later to the newly founded pop culture magazine The Face. Throughout the decade, Savage wrote for The Observer and the New Statesman, providing high-brow commentary on popular culture.

In 1991, Savage designed a record sleeve for the then little-known Welsh rock band Manic Street Preachers. The single was called "Feminine Is Beautiful".

His book England's Dreaming, a history of the rise of punk rock in the UK and the US in the mid- to late 1970s, was published by Faber and Faber in 1991 and received a positive review in Entertainment Weekly. It was used as the basis for a television programme, Punk and the Pistols, shown on BBC2 in 1995, and an updated edition in 2001 featured a new introduction which made mention of the Pistols' 1996 reunion and the release of the 2000 Pistols documentary film, The Filth and The Fury. A companion piece, The England's Dreaming Tapes, was published in 2009.

In July 1993, Kurt Cobain gave a dramatically candid interview to Jon Savage. Freely discussed were such controversial topics as Courtney Love, homosexuality, heroin and Cobain's relationship with his Nirvana bandmates.
Conducted with Cobain the night before the now-infamous shoot with legendary photographer Jesse Frohman, and just months before the frontman's death.

Savage continues to write on punk and other genres in a variety of publications, most notably Mojo magazine and The Observer Music Monthly. He wrote the introduction to Mitch Ikeda's Forever Delayed (2002), an official photobook of the Manic Street Preachers.

Savage has appeared in the documentaries Live Forever and NewOrderStory.

Several compilation CDs based on his track lists have also been released, including England's Dreaming (2004) and Meridian 1970 (2005), the latter of which puts forward the argument that 1970 was a high-point for popular music, contrary to critical opinion. He curated the compilation Queer Noises 1961–1978 (2006), a collection of largely overlooked pop songs from that period that carried overt or coded gay messages. His most recent compilations have included the now deleted Fame, Jon Savage's Secret History Of Post-Punk 78–81 on Caroline True Records. His latest curated release on the same label is Perfect Motion, Jon Savage's Secret History Of Second Wave Psychedelia 1988–1993. Also a limited double-vinyl release, this collection posited late eighties/early nineties "Baggy" music as a slight return to the ethos of 60s psychedelia.

Savage's book, Teenage: The Prehistory of Youth Culture, was published in 2007.  It is a history of the concept of teenagers, which begins in the 1870s and ends in 1945 and aims to tell the story of youth culture's prehistory, and dates the advent of today's form of "teenagers" to 1945. The book was adapted into a film by Matt Wolf.

In 2015, Savage published 1966, recalling the popular music and cultural turmoil of that year. He also compiled and wrote the liner notes for a two-disc companion CD, Jon Savage's 1966: The Year the Decade Exploded (Ace Records).

Bibliography

Books

England's Dreaming: Sex Pistols and Punk Rock  (Faber and Faber, 1991)
Picture Post Idols Publisher: London, Collins & Brown, 1992 
The Hacienda Must Be Built  (International Music Publications, 1992)
The Faber Book of Pop (edited with Hanif Kureishi) (Faber and Faber, 1995)
Touching From a Distance (Foreword) (Faber and Faber, 1995)
Time Travel: From the Sex Pistols to Nirvana – Pop, Media and Sexuality, 1977–96 Publisher: London, Chatto & Windus, 1996 
Teenage: The Creation of Youth Culture Publisher: Viking Books, 2007 
1 Top Class Manager: The Notebooks of Joy Division's Manager, 1978–1980 (Anti-Archivists) 
The England's Dreaming Tapes (University of Minnesota Press, 2010)
Jon Savage/Linder Sterling: The Secret Public (Boo-Hooray Gallery, 2010)
Sex Pistols and Punk (Faber and Faber 2012) )
Punk: Chaos to Couture (2013)

This Searing Light, the Sun and Everything Else: Joy Division (Faber and Faber 2019)

Articles

Screenplays
Joy Division  documentary film, screenwriter, 2008

Discography
England's Dreaming (Trikont 2004)
Meridian 1970 (Forever Heavenly 2005)
Queer Noises – From the Closet to the Charts (Trikont 2006)
The Shadows of Love – Intense Tamla 1966–1968 (Commercial Marketing 2006)
 Dreams Come True – Classic Wave Electro 1982–87 (Domino Records 2008)
Teenage – The Invention of Youth 1911–1945 (Trikont 2009)
Fame – Jon Savage's Secret History of Post Punk 1978–81 (Caroline True Records 2012)
Perfect Motion- Jon Savage's Secret History of Second-Wave Psychedelia 1988-93 (Caroline True Records 2015)Jon Savage's 1965: The Year the Sixties Ignited (Ace Records 2018)Jon Savage's 1966: The Year the Decade Exploded (Ace Records 2015)Jon Savage's 1967 ~ The Year Pop Divided (Ace Records 2017)Jon Savage's 1968 ~ The Year the World Burned (Ace Records 2018)Jon Savage's 1969-1971 ~ Rock Dreams on 45 (Ace Records 2019)
Do You Have The Force? -Jon Savage's Alternate History Of Electronica 1978-82 (Caroline True Records 2020)''

References

External links
 2002 interview
 2007 interview
 England's Dreaming Archive Papers held at Liverpool John Moores University

1953 births
Living people
People from Paddington
Alumni of Magdalene College, Cambridge
English male journalists
English music critics
English music journalists
Sex Pistols
Melody Maker writers
Mojo (magazine) people
British LGBT writers